This is a list of years in Rwanda.

20th century

21st century

See also
 Timeline of Rwandan history
 Chronology of the Rwandan Genocide
 Timeline of Kigali

 
Rwanda history-related lists
Rwanda